Erika Miklósa (born 9 June 1970) is a Hungarian coloratura soprano.

Career
Born in the southern Hungarian town of Kiskunhalas, she spent her youth as an athlete training for the heptathlon. Miklósa was Hungarian Junior Champion in the high jump. However, an accident forced her to switch career paths. Because of her good singing skills she chose to be a singer. At first, she sang at family gatherings, weddings, and formal celebrations. On one such occasion, a singing-master heard her and almost immediately began to teach the 16-year-old. Soon she went on to study music at the Franz Liszt Conservatory of Music in Szeged as well as in Milan and New York. She became a soloist at the Hungarian State Opera in 1990. Her signature role is the Queen of the Night from Mozart's The Magic Flute. She sang also at the Royal Opera House in London, at the Vienna State Opera, at the Metropolitan Opera in New York and many more famous opera houses. In 2004, she debuted at the Metropolitan Opera in her signature Queen of the Night role.

Awards and commendations
Pro Opera Lyrica – Opera Singer of the Year 1993 (Hungary)
International Mozart Competition – 1st Prize in voice category (1993)
European Award for Culture, Zurich (1995)
Order of Merit Member Cross (Hungary, 1998)
Honorary Citizen of Kiskunhalas (1999)
Artist of Bács County (2003)
Kossuth Prize (2012)

Discography
 Die Zauberflöte (2006) with Dorothea Röschmann, Christoph Strehl, René Pape; Claudio Abbado conducting; Deutsche Grammophon
 West Side Story (2009) Sony
 The Magic Flute (2011), Metropolitan Opera

References

External links
 
 
 
 Performance schedule at Operabase
 , medley ("Maria"/"Tonight") from West Side Story with Plácido Domingo
 Hungary greets FIFA delegation: Erika Miklosa sings for Blatter. Fifa.com
 Erika Miklósa's successful concert at the Hungarian Embassy in London, Hungarian embassy in London, News
 Erika Miklosa'a performance in Die Zauberflöte reviewed, The Stage Reviews, 30 January 2008
 The Magic Flute in Emeryville: SpearHeadnews.com

1970 births
Living people
Hungarian operatic sopranos
People from Kiskunhalas
Academy of Vocal Arts alumni
20th-century Hungarian women opera singers
21st-century Hungarian women opera singers